Alagu Subramaniam (1910–1971) was a British Ceylon born writer, a prominent figure in London's Bloomsbury literary circle, a Barrister-at-Law of The Honourable Society of Lincoln's Inn, and an Advocate of the Supreme Court of Ceylon.

He is the author of The Big Girl & Other Stories a retro-collection of short stories; they recount scenes of life in Jaffna during the colonial era, which includes the short story "Professional Mourners" which reflects the obsolete customs and practices of professional mourning done by some Sri Lankan Tamil communities.

He also authored the book Closing Time & Other Stories which contains stories set in London during the World War 2 era.

Mulk Raj Anand and Iqbal Singh published one of his short stories in their anthology Indian Short Stories (New India Publishing Company, 1946). His short stories were published by a number of journals, such as Life, Letters Today, Left Review and Tribune.

He was involved with the anti-colonial organization Swaraj House which was formed in 1942 as a break-away group from the British Committee of the Indian National Congress.

He was one of the founders and editors of the literary magazine Indian Writing of which Rabindranath Tagore and Jawaharlal Nehru also contributed.

Early life
Alagu Subramaniam belongs to the Sri Lankan Tamil community. His father was a judge in Ceylon and his grandfather was a literary personage.

He had his early schooling at Jaffna Central College.

Commentary by notable people
"Mr. Subramaniayam could have had a sound practice at the English Bar, but he preferred to pursue his literary work, which is of a higher order" 
- Lester Hutchinson, D es L., Former MP (British House of Commons)

"Stories told sardonically and succinctly" 
- Philip Day, Sunday Times (London)

"Among the Sri Lankan writers who belonged to the English-speaking elite of the early post-independence era, the London-based barrister Alagu Subramaniam used to be prominent. At a time we are heading for the third decade of the 21st Century, when most of what used to be commonplace has become history, it was a great pleasure to have a copy of the new impression of the 1964 imprint of The Big Girl & Other Stories by Subramaniam whose "Professional Mourners", I consider one of the best Sri Lankan short stories written in English for the sincerity and localness he maintains throughout his narration. My paper on it uploaded to the www.academia.edu in early 2018 under the topic "Servile Mourning for the Powerful: A Critical Reading of ‘Professional Mourners’ by Alagu Subramaniam" has attracted nearly 4000 views from an international readership spread across the world. I have received many commendations for uploading it as the humour it carries is both innocent, and caustic at the same time."

- E. A. Gamini Fonseka BA (Kelaniya), MA (Edinburgh), PhD (Vaasa), Senior Professor in English, Department of English

Personal life
Alagu Subramaniam was married to a graduate teacher.

The Big Girl & Other Stories

The Big Girl & Other Stories is a retro-collection of short stories by Alagu Subramaniam.

The stories recount scenes of life in Jaffna during the colonial era.

The Big Girl contains 17 finely-written episodes(including “Professional Mourners” of humour, surprise, pathos and rare insight into the daily lives of people, with all the historical, religious, cultural and psychological diversity and complexity.

The style of these stories is deceptively simple (although the stories never are). By using simple language and few obvious stylistic devices, every word becomes important.

The book which had disappeared from circulation has now been updated and reprinted in its entirety. These stories evocatively capture the ethos of an era now past and will leave someone nostalgic for a simpler time.

Background
When this book of short stories written by Alagu Subramaniam was first published in 1964, Ceylon had been independent of the British for about 16 years. Then as now, the effect of colonialism was a topic of open discussion.

English writers of the past have often written from the perspective of coloniser rather than colonised. However, Ceylonese born Subramaniam writes from a Sri Lankan viewpoint. In the stories we are shown, not told. Alagu Subramaniam makes each story a small jewel of drama and compassion, revealing in large ways and small.

Solomon’s Justice
One example. “Solomon’s Justice” shows how an imported religious tradition (evangelical Christianity) – here a too literal understanding of a Christian story – can desensitise people to what native traditions themselves preserve.

In this story, the collision of traditions is emphasised by the coroner - who wears both white, ‘the appropriate colour for an Asian funeral’ and black, a ‘necktie, the symbol of European mourning’. The magistrate, presiding over a dispute about who is wife and who ex-wife to their deceased husband and thus entitled to make funeral arrangements, insists that the disputants keep ‘the Queen’s peace’.

But the appropriateness of keeping to standards of European decorum in a Sri Lankan context is immediately questioned – ‘”The Queen’s peace in Buckingham Palace?’” The dispute’s ‘resolution’ is eventually provided by a Mother Superior. Her brutal suggestion: severing the corpse in half, thus solving the problem over the funeral, a ceremony intended as a mark of reverence, love and respect for the deceased.

The Thorn
Other stories show how the displacement of traditional culture can affect so deeply the most vulnerable. “The Thorn” shows the emotional effects on a very young girl (learning English reduces her to tears), and demonstrates the casual emotional blackmail involved (your Mother won't go to heaven). These effects embed themselves into even the simplest daily act – eating a meal – causing frustration and distress through the inability to eat ‘properly’ with a ‘thorn’ (fork), rather than her fingers.

The Scholar
Several stories examine the conflict between a modernising younger generation and an older tradition. In “The Scholar” Thambirajah is introduced as successful in the new, modern way (having received a scholarship to study in England for three years). Such success ironically makes him an attractive prospect for a traditional arranged marriage, which his parents duly organise for him.

The story turns on this conflict between tradition and modernity, older and younger generations (Tharimbirajah has met another student, Radha, and both want to marry). However, in the end the force of tradition wins out (and here force means exactly that, physical force – Radha is beaten into submission). The power of tradition is more destructive still than simply separating two young people – but read the story to discover its ending.

Cousin Thampoo
In “Cousin Thampoo” for example, changing the position of a single comma in the story's final sentence would have entirely changed the story's significance. The story's ending as written is the more complex and resonating one, an example of the care, craft and wisdom of writer and stories.

Professional Mourners
In “Professional Mourners”, a funeral in a village is depicted where a self-important organiser of the funeral behaving inhumanly with low caste professional mourners despite their own mother's death on that morning.

The lower caste women, gets unexpected sympathy at the funeral, and the organizer of the funeral put himself in an awkward position.

Closing Time & Other Stories

Closing Time & Other Stories is a collection of short stories set in London and depicts the life of a foreign student in the Second World War era London.

Single Room

Single Room is about a new student in London, looking for a room for himself.

The Kid

The Kid features a law student who is also a writer.

Liabilities

Liabilities is about a barrister who also works as a manager of a bookshop.

Closing Time

Closing Time is about a number of writers and poets who move from one pub to another after each one closes.

Bibliography

References

External links
 The Extraordinary Alagu Subramaniam, Thuppahi's Blog

1971 deaths
Ceylonese advocates
Members of Lincoln's Inn
Sri Lankan Tamil lawyers
Sri Lankan Tamil writers
Tamil-language writers
1910 births